The 1987 Trans-Am Series was the 22nd running of the Sports Car Club of America's premier series. Merkur nearly swept the season, with Porsche winning at Brainerd.

Results

Championship standings (Top 10)

References

Trans-Am Series
Trans-Am